Holy Heart of Mary Regional High School is a public high school located in St. John's, Newfoundland and Labrador, Canada.

History 
Built in the 1950s by the Presentation sisters and the Sisters of Mercy, it was originally an all-girls school called "Holy Heart of Mary Regional High School for Girls". The first classes were held on November 17, 1958.

Outline 
Historically the student population has often exceeded 1000 students, making it one of the largest in the province. Holy Heart offers several Advanced Placement courses, and is also the only school in Newfoundland that currently offers the International Baccalaureate Diploma Programme. It is also one of the few schools in the province providing courses in English as a Second Language.

Academic standards are high at this institution and the teaching instruction offered typically includes a higher number of instructors and teachers with post-graduate degrees; many teachers at this public high school also teach at Memorial University. 

Holy Heart's students have had strong showings in regional and provincial high school sports leagues, with teams in soccer, hockey, basketball, rugby, and other sports. Students have also had successes with national academic programs such as SHAD and the Canada Wide Science Fair, and at provincial competitions in drama, debating, and other activities.

The music program at the school is nationally and internationally renowned. The Holy Heart of Mary Chamber Choir, formerly led by Susan Quinn and now led by Robert Colbourne, won a gold medal at the International Youth and Music Festival in Vienna, Austria, in 1996, and has continued to win local and national awards since then, including First Prize for under-19 school choirs at the National Music Festival of Canada in 2007. It also performed at Carnegie Hall in May 2010. Several choir alumni perform in another highly regarded amateur choir managed by Quinn, the Quintessential Vocal Ensemble.

The instrumental program, formerly led by Grant Etchegary and now led by Rob Lee, a recipient of the Prime Minister's Awards for Teaching Excellence, enjoys a similar reputation throughout Canada.

The Holy Heart Auditorium, attached to the school, was refurbished in 2006 and again in 2012 and has played host to a number of concerts from outside the school community. The theatre is open to students and staff during the academic day; students have full access to the latest theatrical equipment. The school puts on an annual musical in the theatre with a cast composed of students from the performing arts certificate program and other students.

This school is located in the downtown to midtown area of the city and is located within the historic district of St. John's. Some of the most expensive condos in St. John's (prices ranging from $500,000 to over $1,000,000) are within Place Bonaventure, directly to the left of the school. The Rooms, the provincial art gallery and archives, is located four minutes from the main doors.

The downtown location of this school make it a popular choice for the children of professional families and those who live within the downtown core, heritage district and even some outlying suburbs. Parking is expansive and student parking is included to the left of the school.

References

External links

High schools in St. John's, Newfoundland and Labrador
International Baccalaureate schools in Newfoundland and Labrador